Spencer Brook Township is a township in Isanti County, Minnesota, United States. The population was 1,495 at the 2000 census.

This township took its name from Spencer Brook.

Geography
According to the United States Census Bureau, the township has a total area of 35.4 square miles (91.8 km), of which 34.3 square miles (89.0 km)  is land and 1.1 square miles (2.8 km)  (3.05%) is water.

Demographics

As of the census of 2000, there were 1,495 people, 532 households, and 427 families residing in the township. There were 602 housing units at an average density of 17.5/sq mi (6.8/km). The racial makeup of the township was 97.59% White, 0.74% Native American, 0.33% Asian, and 1.34% from two or more races. Hispanic or Latino of any race were 0.40% of the population.

There were 532 households, out of which 35.2% had children under the age of 18 living with them, 70.3% were married couples living together, 4.1% had a female householder with no husband present, and 19.7% were non-families. 14.3% of all households were made up of individuals, and 3.4% had someone living alone who was 65 years of age or older.  The average household size was 2.81 and the average family size was 3.10.

In the township the population was spread out, with 26.6% under the age of 18, 7.2% from 18 to 24, 31.9% from 25 to 44, 25.6% from 45 to 64, and 8.8% who were 65 years of age or older.  The median age was 37 years. For every 100 females, there were 103.1 males.  For every 100 females age 18 and over, there were 107.6 males.

The median income for a household in the township was $55,500, and the median income for a family was $58,235. Males had a median income of $39,333 versus $29,038 for females. The per capita income for the township was $21,615.  About 1.8% of families and 3.7% of the population were below the poverty line, including 6.6% of those under age 18 and 2.3% of those age 65 or over.

References

Townships in Isanti County, Minnesota
Townships in Minnesota